Godefroid may refer to:

Marie-Éléonore Godefroid (1778–1849), French painter
Félix Godefroid (1818–1897), Belgian harpist, who composed for his instrument and for the piano
Godefroid Kurth (1847–1916), Belgian historian
Godefroid Munongo (1925–1992), politician of the Democratic Republic of the Congo
Prince Godefroid Kamatari, (1957–2005), grandson of mwami HM Mutaga IV Mbikije of Burundi, and a son of HRH Prince Ignace Kamatari
Sébastien Godefroid (born 1971), Belgian sailor